Sandra Elizabeth Levy (born 3 December 1965 in Kingston, Jamaica) is a former field hockey player, who represented Canada at the 1988 Summer Olympics in Seoul, Korea and the 1992 Summer Olympics in Barcelona, Spain. The Toronto, Ontario native ended up in seventh place with the Canadian National Team in Barcelona, after having finished in sixth place four years earlier in Seoul, South Korea.

University hockey and education 
Levy was a member of Toronto's York Lions field hockey and indoor hockey teams. She obtained a Bachelor's degree in English in 1990 from York University and an LL.B. from Osgoode Hall Law School in 1995.

International career 
Levy's international career spanned eleven years with the national women's team. During this time, her teams won silver medal at the 1991 Pan American Games, and bronze at the 1987 Pan American Games.

Tournaments include:
 1987 — Champions Trophy, Amstelveen (4th place)
 1988 — Olympic Games, Seoul (6th place)
 1992 — Olympic Games, Barcelona (7th place)

Canadian Olympic Committee
After retiring, Levy has been involved with the Canadian Olympic Committee. In 1988, she was a member of the mission team to the 1988 Winter Olympics.  Levy was involved in the  2008 Toronto Olympic bid as Director of Special Projects. In 2014, Levy was the Canadian Chef de Mission for the 2014 Summer Youth Olympics.

Awards and honours
 1985-1989, OWIAA All Star
 1986-1989, CIAU All-Canadian
 1984-1985, CIAU silver medal
 1986-1987, CIAU silver medal 
 1988-1989, CIAU bronze medal
 4x CIAU Tournament All-Star 
 1992-93, York Lions Female Athlete of the Year
 2000, Johnny F. Basset Award for Sporting Excellence and Community Values
 2003, inducted in the York University Sport of Hall of Fame
 2008, African Canadian Achievement Award of Excellence

References

External links
 
 

1965 births
Living people
Canadian female field hockey players
Olympic field hockey players of Canada
Field hockey players at the 1988 Summer Olympics
Field hockey players at the 1992 Summer Olympics
Pan American Games medalists in field hockey
Pan American Games silver medalists for Canada
Pan American Games bronze medalists for Canada
Field hockey players at the 1987 Pan American Games
Field hockey players at the 1991 Pan American Games
Sportspeople from Kingston, Jamaica
Field hockey people from Ontario
Jamaican emigrants to Canada
Black Canadian sportspeople
York University alumni
York Lions players
Medalists at the 1987 Pan American Games
Medalists at the 1991 Pan American Games
Black Canadian sportswomen